The Payoff is a 1942 American film directed by Arthur Dreifuss.

Plot summary 
Reporter Brad MacKay investigates the murder of a district attorney who has tried to prosecute a syndicate that is involved in sleaze and local corruption. He has been using an undercover assistant DA, Phyllis Walker.

Cast 
Lee Tracy as Brad McKay
Tom Brown as Guy Norris
Tina Thayer as Phyllis Walker
Evelyn Brent as Alma Doren
Jack La Rue as John Angus
Ian Keith as Police Inspector Thomas
Robert Middlemass as Norris – Newspaper Publisher
John Maxwell as Moroni – Reporter
John Sheehan as Police Sergeant Brenen
Harry C. Bradley as Dr. Steele
Forrest Taylor as Hugh Walker
Pat Costello as Reporter Pat

External links 

1942 films
American mystery films
1940s crime thriller films
American crime thriller films
American black-and-white films
Films about journalists
Producers Releasing Corporation films
Films directed by Arthur Dreifuss
1940s English-language films
1940s American films